IPSC Laos is the Lao association for practical shooting under the International Practical Shooting Confederation.

References 

Regions of the International Practical Shooting Confederation
Pracrical Shooting